The Fellowship of the British Academy consists of world-leading scholars and researchers in the humanities and social sciences, A varying number of fellows are elected each year in July at the Academy's annual general meeting.

2019
The 2019 annual general meeting was held on 19 July 2019. Elected were 52 fellows, 20 corresponding fellows, and 4 honorary fellows.

 Fellows

 Professor Erkko Autio, Professor in Technology Venturing and Entrepreneurship, Imperial College Business School
 Professor Christina Boswell, Professor of Politics, University of Edinburgh
 Professor Laurence Brockliss, Emeritus Professor of Early Modern French History, University of Oxford; Emeritus Fellow, Magdalen College, Oxford
 Professor Charlotte Brunsdon, Professor of Film and Television Studies, University of Warwick
 Professor Harriet Bulkeley, Professor of Geography, Durham University
 Professor Josep Call, Professor in Evolutionary Origins of Mind, University of St Andrews; Director, Budongo (Chimpanzee) Research Unit, Edinburgh Zoo
 The Rev'd Professor Sarah Coakley, Honorary Professor, Logos Institute, University of St Andrews; Norris-Hulse Professor emerita, Faculty of Divinity, University of Cambridge; Professorial Research Fellow, The Institute for Religion and Critical Inquiry, Australian Catholic University
 Professor Gregory Currie, Professor of Philosophy, University of York
 Professor Harri Englund, Professor of Social Anthropology, University of Cambridge
 Professor Geoffrey Evans, Professor of the Sociology of Politics, University of Oxford; Official Fellow, Nuffield College, Oxford
 Professor Lindsay Farmer, Professor of Law, University of Glasgow
 Professor Margot Finn, Professor of Modern British History, University College London
 Dr Annabel Gallop, Head of Southeast Asia section, The British Library
 Professor Peter Gatrell, Professor of Modern History, University of Manchester
 Professor Susan Golombok, Director, Centre for Family Research, University of Cambridge
 Professor Emily Gowers, Professor of Latin Literature, University of Cambridge; Fellow, St John's College, Cambridge
 Professor Stephen Graham, Professor of Cities and Society, Newcastle University
 Professor Louise Gullifer, Professor of Commercial Law, University of Oxford; Fellow, Harris Manchester College, Oxford
 Professor Leslie Hannah, Professor Emeritus, Department of Economic History, London School of Economics
 Professor Clare Harris, Professor of Visual Anthropology, University of Oxford; Curator for Asian Collections, Pitt Rivers Museum
 Professor Rebecca Herissone, Professor of Musicology, University of Manchester
 Professor Caroline Heycock, Professor of Syntax, University of Edinburgh
 Professor Edward Hughes, Professor of French, Queen Mary University of London
 Professor Herminia Ibarra, The Charles Handy Professor of Organisational Behaviour, London Business School
 Professor Susan James, Professor of Philosophy, Birkbeck, University of London
 Professor Deborah James, Professor of Anthropology, London School of Economics
 Professor Andrew Kahn, Professor of Russian Literature, University of Oxford; Fellow and Tutor, St Edmund Hall, Oxford
 Professor Simon Kirby, Professor of Language Evolution, University of Edinburgh
 Professor Matthew Lambon Ralph, Director MRC Cognition and Brain Sciences Unit, University of Cambridge
 Professor David Langslow, Professor of Classics and Hulme Professor of Latin, University of Manchester
 Professor Esther Leslie, Professor of Political Aesthetics, Birkbeck, University of London
 Professor Julia Lovell, Professor of Modern Chinese History and Literature, Birkbeck, University of London
 Professor Helen Margetts, Professor of Society and the Internet, Oxford Internet Institute, University of Oxford; Director, Public Policy Programme, Alan Turing Institute for Data Science and Artificial Intelligence
 Professor Jennifer Mason, Professor of Sociology, University of Manchester
 Dr Margaret Meyer, Official Fellow in Economics, Nuffield College, Oxford
 Professor Irina Nikolaeva, Professor of Linguistics, School of Oriental and African Studies, University of London
 Professor Ad Putter, Professor of Medieval English, University of Bristol
 Professor Imran Rasul, Professor of Economics, University College London
 Professor James Raven, Professor of Modern History, University of Essex; Senior Research Fellow of Magdalene College, University of Cambridge
 Professor Alec Ryrie, Professor of the History of Christianity, Durham University
 Professor Katie Scott, Professor in Art History, Courtauld Institute of Art
 Professor Jason Sharman, Sir Patrick Sheehy Professor of International Relations, University of Cambridge
 Dr Alison Sheridan, Principal Archaeological Research Curator, Department of Scottish History and Archaeology, National Museums Scotland (NMSProfessor Elizabeth ShoveProfessor of Sociology, Lancaster University
 Professor Gerry Simpson, Professor of Public International Law, London School of Economics
 Professor Peter Smith, Professor of Social Statistics, University of Southampton
 Professor Tiffany Stern, Professor of Shakespeare and Early Modern Drama, Shakespeare Institute, University of Birmingham
 Professor Robert Stern, Professor of Philosophy, University of Sheffield
 Professor Andrew Webber, Professor of Modern German and Comparative Culture, University of Cambridge
 Professor Eyal Weizman, Professor of Spatial and Visual Cultures and Director of Forensic Architecture, Goldsmiths, University of London
 Professor Ian Wood, Emeritus Professor of Early Medieval History, University of Leeds

Corresponding fellows

 Professor Gianmario Borio, Professor of Musicology, University of Pavia; Director, Institute for Music, Condazione Giorgio Cini, Venice
 Professor Veena Das, Krieger-Eisenhower Professor of Anthropology, Johns Hopkins University
 Professor Katherine Dunbabin, Professor Emerita, Department of Classics, McMaster University
 Professor Stephen Greenblatt, John Cogan University Professor of the Humanities, Harvard University
 Professor Dr. Dr. h.c. mult. Dieter Grimm, Professor Emeritus, Humboldt University Berlin; Permanent Fellow, Wissenschaftskolleg zu Berlin
 Professor Donna Haraway, Distinguished Professor Emerita, History of Consciousness Department, University of California, Santa Cruz
 Professor Cynthia Hardy, Laureate Professor of Management, University of Melbourne; Professor, Cardiff Business School
 Professor Stephanie Jamison, Distinguished Professor of Asian Languages and Cultures and of Indo-European Studies, University of California, Los Angeles
 Professor Marcia Johnson, Sterling Professor Emerita of Psychology, Yale University
 Professor Ira Katznelson, Ruggles Professor of Political Science and History, Columbia University
 Professor Valerie Kivelson, Thomas N Tentler Collegiate Professor and Arthur F Thurnau Professor of History, University of Michigan
 Professor Michèle Lamont, Robert I Goldman Professor of European Studies, Professor of Sociology and of African and African American Studies, Harvard University
 Professor Hazel Markus, Davis-Brack Professor in the Behavioral Sciences, Stanford University
 Professor Mark Mazower, Ira D Wallach Professor of History, Columbia University
 Professor Terttu Nevalainen, Professor and Research Director, Department of Languages, Faculty of Arts, University of Helsinki 
 Professor Ato Quayson, Professor of English, New York University
 Professor Jean Tirole, Professor of Economics, Toulouse School of Economics
 Professor Lyn Wadley, Honorary Professor of Archaeology, Evolutionary Studies Institute, University of the Witwatersrand
 Professor Michael Watts, Class of 63 and Chancellor's Professor of Geography and Development Studies Emeritus, University of California, Berkeley
 Professor Peter Zieme, Senior Researcher, Berlin Brandenburg Academy of Science and Humanities

Honorary fellows

 Sir John Chilcot GCB, PC, Former Permanent Secretary, Chair of inquiry into Iraq war
 Michael Frayn FRSL, Freelance writer
 Professor Margaret MacMillan CC, CH, Emeritus Professor of International History, University of Oxford; Professor of History, University of Toronto
 Advocate General Eleanor Sharpston QC, Advocate General, Court of Justice of the European Union

2018
The 2018 annual general meeting was held on 20 July 2018. Elected were 52 fellows, 20 corresponding fellows, and 4 honorary fellows: this was a record number of 76 new fellows.

 Fellows

 Lynn Abrams, Professor of Modern History, University of Glasgow
 Ben Ansell, Professor of Comparative Democratic Institutions, University of Oxford
 Sarah-Jayne Blakemore, Professor of Cognitive Neuroscience, University College London
 Hagit Borer, chair in Linguistics, Queen Mary University of London
 Richard Bourke, Professor in the History of Political Thought, Queen Mary University of London
 Douglas Cairns, FRSE, Professor of Classics, University of Edinburgh
 Rajesh Chandy, Tony and Maureen Wheeler Chair in Entrepreneurship, and Professor of Marketing, London Business School
 Joya Chatterji, Professor of South Asian History, University of Cambridge
 Brian Cheffins, S. J. Berwin Professor of Corporate Law, University of Cambridge
 Veronica Della Dora, Professor of Human Geography, Royal Holloway, University of London
 Tia DeNora, Professor of Sociology of Music, University of Exeter
 Christopher Evans, executive director, Cambridge Archaeological Unit, University of Cambridge
 James Fairhead, Professor of Anthropology, University of Sussex
 Simon Gaunt, Professor of French Language and Literature, King's College, London
 Maitreesh Ghatak, Professor of Economics, London School of Economics and Political Science
 David Gordon, Professor of Social Justice, University of Bristol
 Catherine Hall, Professor Emerita of Modern British Social and Cultural History, Chair of the Centre for the Study of British Slave-ownership Department of History, University College London
 Canon Professor Carol Harrison, Lady Margaret Professor of Divinity, and Canon of Christ Church Cathedral, University of Oxford
 Martin Jones, George Pitt-Rivers Professor of Archaeological Science, University of Cambridge
 Alison Liebling, Director, Prisons Research Centre; Professor of Criminology and Criminal Justice, University of Cambridge
 Elena Lieven, Professor of Psychology and Director, ESRC International Centre for Language and Communicative Development (LuCiD), University of Manchester
 Jane Lightfoot, Professor of Greek Literature, University of Oxford
 Sonia Livingstone, OBE, Professor of Social Psychology, London School of Economics and Political Science
 Ian Loader, Professor of Criminology, University of Oxford
 Eleanor Maguire, FMedSci, FRS, Hon. MRIA, Professor of Cognitive Neuroscience, University College London
 Peter Marshall, Professor of History, University of Warwick
 Peter Miller, Professor of Management Accounting, London School of Economics and Political Science
 Melinda Mills, MBE, Nuffield Professor of Sociology, University of Oxford
 Niamh Moloney, Professor of Financial Markets Law, London School of Economics and Political Science 
 Hervé Moulin, FRSE, D. J. Robertson Chair in Economics, University of Glasgow
 Catherine Nash, Professor of Human Geography, Queen Mary University of London
 Lynda Nead, Pevsner Professor of History of Art, Birkbeck, University of London
 Samir Okasha, Professor of Philosophy of Science, University of Bristol
 Wen-chin Ouyang, Professor of Arabic and Comparative Literature, School of Oriental and African Studies, University of London
 Ian Rumfitt, Senior Research Fellow, All Souls College, Oxford
 David Runciman, Professor of Politics, University of Cambridge
 Timon Screech, Professor of the History of Art, School of Oriental and African Studies, University of London
 Richard Sennett, OBE, Centennial Professor of Sociology, London School of Economics and Political Science; University Professor of the Humanities, New York University
 Tom Shakespeare, Professor of Disability Research, Norwich Medical School, University of East Anglia
 Alexandra Shepard, Professor of Gender History, University of Glasgow
 Helen Small, Professor of English Literature, University of Oxford
 Edmund Sonuga-Barke, FMedSci, Professor of Developmental Psychology, Psychiatry and Neuroscience, King's College London
 Jonathan Spencer, FRSE, Regius Professor of South Asian Language, Culture and Society, University of Edinburgh
 Charles Stafford, Professor of Anthropology, London School of Economics and Political Science
 Fiona Stafford, Professor of English Language and Literature, University of Oxford
 Judith Still, Professor of French and Critical Theory, University of Nottingham
 Victor Tadros, Professor of Law and Legal Theory, University of Warwick
 Silvana Tenreyro, Professor of Economics, London School of Economics and Political Science
 The Reverend Canon Professor David Thomas, Professor of Christianity and Islam, University of Birmingham
 Gill Valentine, Provost and Deputy Vice-Chancellor, University of Sheffield
 Alan Warde, Professor of Sociology, University of Manchester
 Georgina Waylen, Professor of Politics, University of Manchester

Corresponding fellows

 Leslie Aiello, President Emerita, Wenner-Gren Foundation for Anthropological Research, New York
 Orley Ashenfelter, Joseph Douglas Green 1895 Professor of Economics, Princeton University
 Seyla Benhabib, Eugene Meyer Professor of Political Science and Philosophy, Yale University; Senior Fellow, Columbia Center for Contemporary Critical Thought, Columbia University
 Robert Brandom, Distinguished Professor, Philosophy Department, University of Pittsburgh
 Gergely Csibra, Professor, Department of Cognitive Science, Central European University, Budapest
 Okwui Enwezor, Formerly Director, Haus der Kunst, Munich
 Martha Farah, Walter H Annenberg Professor in Natural Sciences and Director, Center for Neuroscience and Society, University of Pennsylvania
 Jean-Louis Ferrary, Directeur d'études émérite à l'École Pratique des Hautes Études
 Jerry A. Hausman, Professor of Economics, Massachusetts Institute of Technology
 Corinne Hofman, Professor of Caribbean Archaeology, and Dean of the Faculty of Archaeology, Leiden University
 Robert Jervis, Adlai E Stevenson Professor of International Politics, Columbia University
 William Chester Jordan, Dayton-Stockton Professor of History, Princeton University
 Peter Lake, University Distinguished Professor of History and Martha Ingram Chair of History, Vanderbilt University
 Bruno Latour, Professor Emeritus, Sciences Po, Paris
 Angelika Neuwirth, Supervisor of the Project "Corpus Coranicum. Dokumentation und historisch-kritischer Kommentar zum Koran" at the Berlin Brandenburgische Akademie der Wissenschaften 
 Carlo Ossola, Chaire de Littératures modernes de l'Europe néolatine, Collège de France
 Barbara Partee, Distinguished University Professor Emerita of Linguistics and Philosophy, University of Massachusetts Amherst
 Lucy Riall, Professor of the History of Europe in the World, European University Institute
 Cheryl Saunders, AO, Melbourne Laureate Professor Emeritus and Professorial Fellow, University of Melbourne
 Roberto Unger, Professor of Law, Harvard University

Honorary fellows

 Joan Bakewell, Baroness Bakewell, DBE, writer, broadcaster, author; President of Birkbeck, University of London
 Sir Andrew Dilnot, CBE, Warden Nuffield College, University of Oxford; chair, UK Statistics Authority
 Tony Harrison, Poet, translator and playwright
 Mary-Kay Wilmers, Editor, London Review of Books.

2017
The 2017 annual general meeting was held on 21 July 2017. Elected were 42 fellows, 20 corresponding fellows, and 4 honorary fellows.

 Fellows

 Franklin Allen, Professor of Finance and Economics and Director, Brevan Howard Centre, Imperial College London
 John Armour, Hogan Lovells Professor of Law and Finance, University of Oxford
 Alison Bashford, Vere Harmsworth Professor of Imperial and Naval History, University of Cambridge; Fellow, Jesus College, Cambridge
 Dauvit Broun FRSE, Professor of Scottish History, University of Glasgow
 Michael Burton, Professor of Psychology, University of York
 Mark Casson, Professor of Economics and Director, Centre for Institutions and Economic History, University of Reading
 Sir Paul Collier CBE, Professor of Economics and Public Policy, Blavatnik School of Government, University of Oxford; Director, International Growth Centre
 Mary Daly, Professor of Sociology and Social Policy, University of Oxford; Fellow, Green Templeton College, Oxford
 Douglas Davies, Professor in the Study of Religion, and Director of the Centre for Death and Life Studies, Durham University
 Paulo de Moraes Farias, Honorary Professor, Department of African Studies and Anthropology, University of Birmingham
 Gillian Douglas, Executive Dean and Professor of Law, The Dickson Poon School of Law, King's College London
 Christian Dustmann, Professor of Economics, and Founding Director CReAM (Centre for Research and Analysis of Migration), University College London
 Jaś Elsner, Professor of Late Antique Art, University of Oxford; Humfry Payne Senior Research Fellow, Corpus Christi College, Oxford
 Gary Gerstle, Paul Mellon Professor of American History, University of Cambridge; Fellow, Sidney Sussex College, Cambridge
 John Gowlett, Professor of Archaeology and Evolutionary Anthropology, University of Liverpool
 Emily Grundy, Professor of Demography, London School of Economics and Political Science
 Sara Hobolt, Sutherland Chair in European Institutions, London School of Economics and Political Science
 Jennifer Hornsby, Professor of Philosophy, Birkbeck, University of London; Co-
 Charles Hulme, Professor of Psychology and Education, University of Oxford; William Golding Senior Research Fellow, Brasenose College, Oxford
 Peter Jackson, Professor of Human Geography, University of Sheffield
 Julian Johnson, Regius Professor of Music, Royal Holloway, University of London
 Paul Kerswill, Professor of Sociolinguistics, University of York
 Melissa Leach CBE, Director, Institute of Development Studies (IDS), University of Sussex
 Richard Ned Lebow, Professor of International Political Theory, King's College London; Bye-Fellow, Pembroke College, Cambridge
 Adam Ledgeway, Professor of Italian and Romance Linguistics and Chair of the Faculty of Modern and Medieval Languages, University of Cambridge; Fellow, Downing College, Cambridge
 M. M. McCabe, Professor of Ancient Philosophy Emerita, King's College London; Keeling Scholar in Residence, University College London; Bye-Fellow, Newnham College, Cambridge
 Angela McRobbie FRSA, Professor of Communications, Goldsmiths University of London
 Charles Mitchell, Professor of Law, University College London
 Tariq Modood MBE, Professor of Sociology, Politics and Public Policy, and Director, Research Centre for the Study of Ethnicity and Citizenship, University of Bristol
 Lynne Murray, Professor of Developmental Psychology, University of Reading
 Francesca Orsini, Professor of Hindi and South Asian Literature, SOAS, University of London
 Chakravarthi Ram-Prasad, Professor of Comparative Religion and Philosophy, Lancaster University
 Nicholas Roe, Professor of English Literature, University of St Andrews
 Eugene Rogan, Professor of Modern Middle Eastern History, University of Oxford; Director, Middle East Centre; Fellow, St Antony's College, Oxford
 Ulinka Rublack, Professor of Early Modern European History, University of Cambridge; Fellow, St John's College, Cambridge
 Barbara Sahakian FMedSci, Professor of Clinical Neuropsychology, Department of Psychiatry and MRC/Wellcome Trust Behavioural and Clinical Neuroscience Institute, University of Cambridge
 Andreas Schönle, Professor of Russian, Queen Mary University of London
 Catriona Seth, Marshal Foch Professor of French Literature, University of Oxford; Fellow, All Souls College, Oxford
 Sir Hew Strachan FRSE, Professor of International Relations, University of St Andrews; Emeritus Fellow, All Souls College, Oxford; Life Fellow, Corpus Christi College, Cambridge
 Anna Vignoles, Professor of Education and Director of Research, Faculty of Education, University of Cambridge
 Teresa Webber, University Reader in Palaeography, University of Cambridge; Fellow, Trinity College, Cambridge
 Gregory Woolf, Director, Institute of Classical Studies, School of Advanced Study; Professor of Classics, University of London

Corresponding fellows

 John Agnew, Distinguished Professor of Geography and Italian, University of California, Los Angeles
 Susanne Baer, Justice, Federal Constitutional Court of Germany; Professor of Law and Gender Studies, Humboldt University; William W Cook Global Law Professor, University of Michigan
 Dr h.c. Eszter Bánffy, Director, Romano-Germanic Commission, German Archaeological Institute
 Caroline Walker Bynum, Professor Emerita of Medieval European History, Institute for Advanced Study, Princeton; University Professor Emerita, Columbia University
 William Cronon, Frederick Jackson Turner and Vilas Research Professor of History, Geography and Environmental Studies, University of Wisconsin-Madison
 Marie-Luce Demonet, Emeritus Professor of French literature (Renaissance), Senior Fellow, Institut Universitaire de France, Centre d'Etudes Supérieures de la Renaissance, University François-Rabelais, Tours
 Georges Didi-Huberman, Directeur d'Études à l'École des Hautes Études en Sciences Sociales (Paris)
 Peter Hall, Krupp Foundation Professor of European Studies, Harvard University
 Rebecca Henderson, John and Natty McArthur University Professor, Harvard University; Co-, Business & Environment Initiative, Harvard Business School
 Nancy Kanwisher, Walter A Rosenblith Professor of Cognitive Neuroscience, and Investigator, McGovern Institute for Brain Research, Massachusetts Institute of Technology
 Mahmood Mamdani, Herbert Lehman Professor of Government and Professor of Anthropology, Columbia University; Professor and executive director, Makerere Institute of Social Research, Makerere University
 Jay McClelland, Lucie Stern Professor in the Social Sciences, and Director, Center for Mind, Brain, and Computation, Stanford University
 James Poterba, Mitsui Professor of Economics, Massachusetts Institute of Technology; President, National Bureau of Economic Research
 Claudia Rapp, Professor of Byzantine Studies, University of Vienna
 Ineke Sluiter, Academy Professor, Royal Netherlands Academy of Arts and Sciences (KNAW); Professor of Greek, Leiden University
 Barbara Stollberg-Rilinger, Professor of Early Modern History, Historical Institute, University of Münster
 Cass Sunstein, Robert Walmsley University Professor, Harvard Law School
 Agnès van Zanten, Senior CNRS Research Professor, Centre National de la Recherche Scientifique (CNRS)
 Manfred Woidich, Emeritus Professor of Arabic Language and Linguistics, University of Amsterdam

 Honorary Fellows

 Dame Antonia Byatt DBE, CBE, FRSL, novelist
 Sir Tom Stoppard OM, CBE, FRSL, Playwright and screenwriter; Cameron Mackintosh Visiting Professor of Contemporary Theatre, St Catherine's College, Oxford.

2016
The 2016 annual general meeting was held on 14 July 2016. Elected were 42 fellows, 20 corresponding fellows, and 4 honorary fellows.

 Fellows

 Trevor Allan
 Julia Barrow
 Stephen Broadberry
 Robin Burgess
 Robyn Carston
 Patricia Clavin
 Sean Connolly
 Steven Connor
 Peter Cooper
 Paul Crossley
 Brian Cummings
 Jonathan Dancy
 Jane Duckett
 Nancy Edwards
 Martin Eimer
 Ewan Ferlie
 Judith Freedman
 Miranda Fricker
 Robert Frost
 Douglas Gale
 Matthew Gandy
 Simon Goldhill
 Hilary Graham CBE
 John Hudson
 Lorna Hutson
 Emily Jackson
 Kelvyn Jones
 Simon Keay
 Susanne Küchler
 Nilli Lavie
 Elizabeth Eva Leach
 Michael MacDonald
 Catherine Merridale
 Catherine Morgan
 Michael Power
 Sophie Scott
 Duncan Snidal
 Judy Wajcman
 Patricia Waugh
 Fiona Williams OBE
 Michael Wright
 Patrick Wright

Corresponding fellows

 Pauline Allen
 Susan Athey
 Peter Bellwood
 Gráinne De Búrca
 Esther Duflo
 Kathleen Eisenhardt
 Laura Engelstein
 Denis Feeney
 Jane M. Jacobs
 George Lewis
 Toril Moi
 Joel Mokyr
 Elizabeth J. Perry
 Derek R. Peterson
 Robert J. Sampson
 Núria Sebastián Gallés
 Wolfgang Streeck
 Sanjay Subrahmanyam
 Judith Thomson
 Michael Walzer

Honorary fellows

 Sir Paul Nurse
 Justice Kate O'Regan
 Lord Sainsbury of Turville
 The Honorable Janet L. Yellen

2015 
The following fellows of the British Academy were elected at the annual general meeting in 2015:

 Fellows

 Janette Atkinson, FMedSci. Emeritus Professor, University College London; Visiting Professor, University of Oxford
 Oriana Bandiera, Professor of Economics, Director of STICERD, London School of Economics
 Melanie Bartley, Emeritus Professor of Medical Sociology, University College London
 Christine Bell, Professor of Constitutional Law, Assistant Principal and executive director, Global Justice Academy, University of Edinburgh
 Julia Black, Professor of Law and Pro Director for Research, London School of Economics and Political Science
 Cyprian Broodbank, John Disney Professor of Archaeology and Director, McDonald Institute for Archaeological Research, University of Cambridge
 David Buckingham, Emeritus Professor of Media and Communications, Loughborough University; Visiting Professor, Sussex University; Visiting Professor, Norwegian Centre for Child Research
 Craig Calhoun, Director and School Professor, London School of Economics
 Michael Carrithers, Professor of Anthropology, Durham University
 Dawn Chatty, Professor of Anthropology and Forced Migration, University of Oxford
 Andy Clark, FRSE. Professor of Logic and Metaphysics, University of Edinburgh
 Thomas Corns, Emeritus Professor of English Literature, Bangor University
 Elizabeth Edwards, Professor of Photographic History, Director of Photographic History Research Centre, De Montfort University
 Briony Fer, Professor of Art History, University College London
 Garth Fowden, Sultan Qaboos Professor of Abrahamic Faiths, University of Cambridge
 Robert Fowler, Henry Overton Wills Professor of Greek, University of Bristol
 Jonardon Ganeri, Professorial Research Associate, Department of the Study of Religions, School of Oriental and African Studies, London; Recurrent Visiting Professor, Department of Philosophy, King's College London
 Andrew Gerstle, Professor of Japanese Studies, School of Oriental and African Studies, University of London
 Robert Gordon, Serena Professor of Italian, University of Cambridge; Fellow, Gonville and Caius College, Cambridge
 Sanjeev Goyal, Professor of Economics, University of Cambridge; Fellow, Christ's College, Cambridge
 Felicity Heal, Emeritus Fellow, Jesus College, Oxford
 Michael Heffernan, Professor of Historical Geography, University of Nottingham
 Almut Hintze, Zartoshty Brothers Professor of Zoroastrianism, School of Oriental and African Studies, University of London
 John M. Hobson, Professor of Politics and International Relations, University of Sheffield
 James Hurford, Emeritus Professor of General Linguistics, University of Edinburgh
 Robert Ladd, Emeritus Professor of Linguistics, University of Edinburgh
 Michael Lobban, Professor of Legal History, London School of Economics and Political Science
 Peter Mandler, Professor of Modern Cultural History, University of Cambridge; Bailey Lecturer in History, Gonville and Caius College, Cambridge
 Rana Mitter, Professor of the History and Politics of Modern China, Deutsche Bank Director of the University China Centre, University of Oxford
 Kia Nobre, Director, Oxford Centre for Human Brain Activity (OHBA); Professor of Translational Cognitive Neuroscience, University of Oxford
 Andy Orchard, Rawlinson and Bosworth Professor of Anglo-Saxon, University of Oxford; Fellow, Pembroke College, Oxford
 Michael Parker Pearson, Professor of British Later Prehistory, Institute of Archaeology, University College London
 Stephen Reicher, Professor of Psychology, University of St Andrews
 Gillian Rose, Professor of Cultural Geography, The Open University
 Cheryl Schonhardt-Bailey, Professor in Political Science, London School of Economics
 Sally Shuttleworth, Professor of English Literature, University of Oxford; Professorial Fellow, St Anne's College, Oxford
 Simon Swain, Professor of Classics and Greco-Arabic Studies, Pro-Vice-Chancellor (Arts and Social Sciences), University of Warwick
 Nicholas Tarrier, Professor of Clinical Psychology and eHealth Studies, King's College London
 Annette Volfing, Professor of Medieval German Literature, University of Oxford; Fellow, Oriel College, Oxford
 Joachim Whaley, Professor of German History and Thought, University of Cambridge; Fellow, Gonville and Caius College, Cambridge
 Richard Widdess, Professor of Musicology, School of Oriental and African Studies, University of London
 Hugh Willmott, Professor of Management, Cass Business School, City University London; Research Professor in Organization Studies, Cardiff Business School

Corresponding fellows

 Philippe Aghion, Robert C Waggoner Professor of Economics, Harvard University; Professeur au College de France sur la Chaire d Economie des Institutions, de l'Innovation, et de la Croissance; Centennial Professor of Economics, London School of Economics
 Mahzarin Banaji, Richard Clarke Cabot Professor of Social Ethics, Harvard University
Lina Bolzoni, Professor of Italian Literature, Scuola Normale Superiore, Pisa
 Joan Bresnan, Sadie Dernham Patek Professor in Humanities, Emerita, Professor of Linguistics, Emerita, and Senior Researcher, CSLI, Stanford University
 Judith Butler, Maxine Elliot Professor of Comparative Literature and Critical Theory, University of California, Berkeley
 Martha Crenshaw, Senior Fellow, Center for International Security and Cooperation (CISAC), Freeman Spogli Institute for International Studies; Professor of Political Science, Stanford University
 Natalio Fernández Marcos, Professor Vinculado ad Honorem, CSIC (Consejo Superior de Investigaciones Científicas), Centro de Ciencias Humanas y Sociales
 Meric Gertler, President, University of Toronto
 Miltiades Hatzopoulos, Formerly Director of the Institute of Greek and Roman Antiquity (KERA), Athens
 Peter Katzenstein, Walter S Carpenter Jr Professor of International Relations, Cornell University
 Christine Korsgaard, Arthur Kingsley Porter Professor of Philosophy, Harvard University
 Michael Mann, Distinguished Professor of Sociology, University of California, Los Angeles; Honorary Professor, University of Cambridge
 Judith Olszowy-Schlanger, Professor of Hebrew and Judaeo-Arabic Manuscript Studies, Ecole Pratique des Hautes Etudes
 Alexander Potts, Max Loehr Collegiate Professor of History of Art, University of Michigan
 Simon Schama, University Professor of History and Art History, Columbia University
 Elizabeth Spelke, Marshall L Berkman Professor of Psychology, Harvard University
 Jane Stapleton, Research Professor of Law, College of Law, Australian National University; Ernest E Smith Professor of Law, University of Texas
 Alain Supiot, Professor, Chaire État social et mondialisation, Collège de France, Paris
 André Vauchez, Emeritus Professor of History of the Middle Ages, University of Paris-Ouest-Nanterre; Former Director of the Ecole Française de Rome
 Jane Waldfogel, Compton Foundation Centennial Professor of Social Work, Columbia University School of Social Work; Visiting Professor, Centre for Analysis of Social Exclusion (CASE), London School of Economics

 Honorary Fellows

 Dame Lynne Brindley DBE, FRSA. Master of Pembroke College, Oxford
 Dame Carol Ann Duffy DBE, FRSL. Professor of Contemporary Poetry and Creative Director of the Manchester Writing School, Manchester Metropolitan University; Poet Laureate
 Sir John Eliot Gardiner CBE. Founder and artistic director of the Monteverdi Choir, the English Baroque Soloists and the Orchestre Révolutionnaire et Romantique

2014 
The following fellows of the British Academy were elected at the annual general meeting in 2014:

 Roger Backhouse, Professor of the History and Philosophy of Economics, University of Birmingham; Part-time Erasmus, University of Rotterdam
 Richard Bentall, Professor of Clinical Psychology, University of Liverpool
 Francesco Billari, Professor of Sociology and Demography, University of Oxford; Fellow, Nuffield College, Oxford
 Susanne Bobzien, Professor of Philosophy, University of Oxford; Senior Research Fellow, All Souls College
 Georgina Born, Professor of Music and Anthropology, University of Oxford; Fellow, Mansfield College, Oxford; Bloch Visiting Professor of Music, University of California, Berkeley
 Joanna Bourke, Professor of History, Birkbeck, University of London
 Margaret Brazier, OBE. Professor of Law, University of Manchester
 Susan Brigden, Langford Fellow and Tutor in History, Lincoln College Oxford; Reader in History, University of Oxford
 Peter Buckley, OBE. Professor of International Business, University of Leeds; Cheung Kong Scholar Chair Professor, University of International Business and Economics, Beijing
 Matthew Collins, Professor of Biomolecular Archaeology, University of York
 David Crouch, Professor of Medieval History, University of Hull
 John Curtice, Professor of Politics, University of Strathclyde
 Sarah Curtis, Professor of Health and Risk and executive director, Institute of Hazard, Risk and Resilience, Durham University
 David Denison, Smith Professor of English Language and Medieval Literature, University of Manchester
 Ingrid De Smet, Professor of French and Neo-Latin Studies, University of Warwick
 Eleanor Dickey, Professor of Classics, University of Reading
 Katrin Flikschuh, Professor of Modern Political Theory, London School of Economics
 Gavin Flood, Professor of Hindu Studies and Comparative Religion, University of Oxford; Academic Director, Oxford Centre for Hindu Studies
 Marina Frolova-Walker, Professor of Music History, Faculty of Music, University of Cambridge; Fellow, Clare College, Cambridge
 Anne Fuchs, Professor of German Studies, University of Warwick
 Tamar Garb, Durning Lawrence Professor in the History of Art, University College London
 Susan Gathercole, MRC Research Professor, University of Cambridge; Director, MRC Cognition and Brain Sciences Unit, Cambridge
 Paul Gilroy, Professor of American and English Literature, King's College London
 Patrick Haggard, Professor of Cognitive Neuroscience, University College London
 Stephen Halliwell, FRSE. Professor of Greek, University of St Andrews
 Henrietta Harrison, Professor of Modern Chinese Studies, University of Oxford
 Jeremy Horder, Professor of Criminal Law, London School of Economics
 Matthew Kramer, Professor of Legal and Political Philosophy, University of Cambridge; Fellow, Churchill College, Cambridge
 Neil Lazarus, Professor of English and Comparative Literary Studies, University of Warwick
 Rae Langton, Professor of Philosophy, University of Cambridge; Fellow, Newnham College, Cambridge
 Judith Lieu, Lady Margaret's Professor of Divinity, University of Cambridge; Fellow, Robinson College, Cambridge
 Christian List, Professor of Political Science and Philosophy, London School of Economics
 Jane Millar, OBE. Professor of Social Policy and Pro-Vice Chancellor (Research), University of Bath
 Ann Phoenix, Professor of Education, Institute of Education, University of London
 Carol Propper, CBE. Professor of Economics, Imperial College Business School; Professor of Economics of Public Policy, University of Bristol
 Tony Prosser, Professor of Public Law, University of Bristol Law School; Visiting Professor, College of Europe, Bruges
 Charlotte Roberts, Professor of Archaeology, Durham University
 Stephen Smith, Senior Research Fellow, All Souls College, Oxford; Professor of History, University of Oxford; Honorary Research Professor, Department of History, University of Essex. 
 Cecilia Trifogli, Professor of Medieval Philosophy, University of Oxford; Fellow, All Souls College, Oxford
 Dimitri Vayanos, Professor of Finance, London School of Economics
 Sarah Whatmore, Professor of Environment and Public Policy, University of Oxford; Fellow, Keble College, Oxford

2013 

The following fellows of the British Academy were elected at the annual general meeting in 2013:

 Dominic Abrams, Professor of Social Psychology and Director of the Centre for the Study of Group Processes, University of Kent
 Roderick Beaton, Koraes Professor of Modern Greek and Byzantine History, Language and Literature and Director of the Centre for Hellenic Studies, King's College London
 Sarah Birch, Chair of Comparative Politics, University of Glasgow
 Paul Boyle, Chief Executive, Economic and Social Research Council; President, Science Europe and Professor of Geography, University of St Andrews
 Michael Braddick, Professor of History and Pro-Vice-Chancellor, University of Sheffield
 Michael Bridge, Cassel Professor of Commercial Law, London School of Economics
 Stella Bruzzi, Professor of Film and Television Studies, University of Warwick
 Martin Butler, Professor of Renaissance Drama, University of Leeds
 Mary Dalrymple, Professor of Syntax, University of Oxford
 Hastings Donnan, Professor of Social Anthropology and Director of the Institute for the Study of Conflict Transformation and Social Justice, Queen's University Belfast
 Stuart Elden, Professor of Political Geography, Durham University
 Katharine Ellis, Stanley Hugh Badock Professor of Music, University of Bristol
 David Fergusson, Professor of Divinity and Principal of New College, University of Edinburgh
 Eilís Ferran, Professor of Company and Securities Law, and J. M. Keynes Fellow and Professorial Fellow of St Catharine's College, University of Cambridge
 John Gardner, Professor of Jurisprudence and Fellow of University College, University of Oxford
 Vincent Gillespie, J. R. R. Tolkien Professor of English, University of Oxford
 Usha Goswami, Professor of Cognitive Developmental Neuroscience, Director of the Centre for Neuroscience in Education and Fellow of St John's College, University of Cambridge
 John Hawthorne, Waynflete Professor of Metaphysical Philosophy and Fellow of Magdalen College, University of Oxford; Visiting Professor, Princeton University
 Richard Hunter, Regius Professor of Greek and Fellow of Trinity College, University of Cambridge
 Ronald Hutton, Professor of History, University of Bristol
 Glynis Jones, Professor of Archaeology, University of Sheffield
 John Kerrigan, Professor of English 2000 and Fellow of St John's College, University Cambridge
 Diana Knight, Professor of French, University of Nottingham
 Cécile Laborde, Professor of Political Theory and Director of the Legal and Political Theory Programme, University College London
 Julia Lee-Thorp, Professor of Archaeological Science, University of Oxford
 John Lowden, Professor of History of Art, Courtauld Institute of Art, University of London
 Colin Mayer, Peter Moores Professor of Management Studies, Saïd Business School and Fellow of Wadham College, University of Oxford
 David Mosse, Professor of Social Anthropology & Head of department, School of Oriental and African Studies, University of London
 Kevin O’Rourke, Chichele Professor of Economic History and Fellow of All Souls College, University of Oxford
 Jenny Ozga, Professor of the Sociology of Education, University of Oxford
 Christopher Page, Professor of Medieval Music and Literature and Fellow of Sidney Sussex College, University of Cambridge
 Lindsay Paterson, Professor of Education Policy, University of Edinburgh
 Lucrezia Reichlin, Professor of Economics, London Business School
 Hamid Sabourian, Professor of Economics and Game Theory, and Fellow of King's College, University of Cambridge
 Joanne Scott, Professor of European Law, University College London
 Timothy Shallice, Emeritus Professor of Neuropsychology, University College London; Senior Professor, SISSA, Trieste
 David Soskice, School Professor of Political Science and Economics, London School of Economics
 Gareth Stedman Jones, Professor of the History of Ideas, Queen Mary, University of London; Director of the Centre for History and Economics and Fellow of King's College, University of Cambridge
 Roel Sterckx, Joseph Needham Professor of Chinese History, Science and Civilization and Fellow of Clare College, University of Cambridge
 Hans van de Ven, Professor of Modern Chinese History, University of Cambridge
 Jane Wardle, FMedSci. Professor of Clinical Psychology and Director, University College London
 Janet Watson,  in Language, University of Leeds

2012 
The following fellows of the British Academy were elected at the annual general meeting in 2012:

 Peter Biller, Professor of History, University of York 
 Julian Birkinshaw, Professor of Strategic and International Management, London Business School 
 Oliver Braddick, FMedSci. Emeritus Professor of Experimental Psychology, University of Oxford 
 Chris Brewin, Professor of Clinical Psychology, UCL 
 Chris Carey, Professor of Greek, UCL 
 Nick Chater, Professor of Behavioural Science, University of Warwick 
 Gillian Clark, Professor Emerita and Senior Research Fellow, University of Bristol 
 Harry Collins, Distinguished Research Professor, Cardiff University 
 Vincent Crawford, Drummond Professor of Political Economy, University of Oxford 
 John Darwin, Beit Lecturer in the History of the Commonwealth, University of Oxford 
 Robin Dennell, Professor Emeritus, University of Sheffield; Visiting Research Fellow, Chinese Academy of Sciences 
 Richard Dyer, Professor of Film Studies, King's College London; Professorial Fellow in Film Studies, University of St Andrews 
 Simon Franklin, Professor of Slavonic Studies, University of Cambridge 
 Knud Haakonssen, Emeritus Professor of Intellectual History, University of Sussex 
 Julian Hoppit, Astor Professor of British History, UCL 
 Jane Humphries, Professor of Economic History, University of Oxford 
 Peter Jackson, Emeritus Professor of Medieval History, Keele University  
 Michael Keating, Professor of Politics, University of Aberdeen 
 Hugh Kennedy, Professor of Arabic, School of Oriental and African Studies 
 Kathleen Kiernan, OBE. Professor of Social Policy and Demography, University of York 
 Robert Layton, Emeritus Professor of Anthropology, University of Durham 
 Julian Le Grand, Richard Titmuss Professor of Social Policy, London School of Economics 
 Nigel Leask, Regius Professor of English Language and Literature, University of Glasgow 
 Peter Mack, Director of the Warburg Institute 
 Miles Ogborn, Professor of Geography, University of London 
 David Parker, Edward Cadbury Professor of Theology, University of Birmingham 
 Huw Price, Bertrand Russell Professor of Philosophy, University of Cambridge 
 Simon Schaffer, Professor of History of Science, University of Cambridge 
 David Solkin, Walter H. Annenberg Professor of History of Art, University of London 
 Martin Stokes, Professor of Music, University of Oxford 
 Charles Tripp, Professor of Politics with reference to Middle East, SOAS 
 Claudio Vita-Finzi, Research Associate, Natural History Museum 
 Neil Walker, Regius Professor of Public Law and the Law of Nature and Nations, University of Edinburgh 
 Helen Watanabe-O’Kelly, Professor of German Literature, University of Oxford 
 Paul Whiteley, Professor of Government, University of Essex 
 Bencie Woll, Professor of Sign Language and Deaf Studies, UCL 
 Neil Wrigley, Professor of Geography, University of Southampton 
 Lucia Zedner, Professor of Criminal Justice, University of Oxford

2011 
The following fellows of the British Academy were elected at the annual general meeting in 2011:

 Dionisius Agius, Al Qasimi Professor of Arabic Studies and Islamic Material Culture, University of Exeter
 Robin Alexander, Fellow of Wolfson College, University of Cambridge; Professor of Education Emeritus, University of Warwick
 John Baines, Professor of Egyptology, University of Oxford
 Timothy Barnes, FRSC. Honorary Professorial Fellow, School of Divinity, University of Edinburgh; Professor Emeritus of Classics, University of Toronto
 Gordon Campbell, Professor of Renaissance Studies, University of Leicester
 Janet Carsten, Professor of Social and Cultural Anthropology, University of Edinburgh
 Jenny Cheshire, Professor of Linguistics, Queen Mary University of London
 Robert Crawford, Professor of Modern Scottish Literature, School of English, University of St Andrews
 Martin Cripps, Professor of Economics, University College London
 Nicholas De Lange, DD. Professor of Hebrew and Jewish Studies, University of Cambridge
 Felix Driver, Professor of Human Geography, Royal Holloway, University of London
 Cécile Fabre, Professor of Political Philosophy and Tutorial Fellow in Philosophy at Lincoln College, University of Oxford
 Simon Frith, Tovey Professor of Music, University of Edinburgh
 Raymond Geuss, Professor of Philosophy, University of Cambridge
 Robert Gordon, Regius Professor of Hebrew, University of Cambridge
 Ruth Harris, Professor in Modern History, Fellow and Tutor at New College, University of Oxford
 John Healey, Professor of Semitic Studies, University of Manchester
 Simon Hix, Professor of European and Comparative Politics, LSE
 Sylvia Huot, Professor of Medieval French Literature, Fellow Pembroke College, University of Cambridge
 Andrew Hurrell, Montague Burton Professor of International Relations, University of Oxford
 Mark Johnson, Director, Centre for Brain and Cognitive Development, Birkbeck, University of London
 Neil Kenny, Reader in Early Modern French Literature and Thought, University of Cambridge
 Jeremy Lawrance, Professor of Spanish Golden Age Studies, University of Nottingham
 Martin Loughlin, Professor of Public Law and Head, Department of Law, LSE
 Neil Macrae, Professor in Psychology, University of Aberdeen
 Antony Manstead, Professor of Psychology, Cardiff University
 Laura Marcus, Goldsmiths’ Professor of English Literature, University of Oxford
 Alan Norrie, Professor of Law, University of Warwick
 Susan Owens, OBE. Professor of Environment and Policy, Head of Department of Geography and Professorial Fellow of Newnham College, University of Cambridge
 Andrea Prat, Professor of Economics, London School of Economics and STICERD
 Hélène Rey, Professor of Economics, London Business School
 Lyndal Roper, Regius Professor of Modern History, Oriel College, University of Oxford
 William Rowe, Anniversary Professor of Poetics, Birkbeck, University of London
 Carolyn Steedman, Professor of History, University of Warwick
 Jeremy Waldron, Chichele Professor of Social and Political Theory, University of Oxford; University Professor and Professor of Law, New York University
 Alan Walker, Professor of Social Policy and Social Gerontology, University of Sheffield
 Arne Westad, Professor of International History, London School of Economics and Political Science
 Per-Olof Wikström, Professor of Ecological and Developmental Criminology, University of Cambridge

Corresponding fellows

 David Blackbourn, Coolidge Professor of History, Harvard University.
 Michael Cook, Class of 1943 University Professor of Near Eastern Studies, Princeton University.
 William Courtenay, Hilldale Professor and Charles Homer Haskins Professor Emeritus, University of Wisconsin-Madison.
 Denis Crouzet, Professor of Modern History, Université Paris Sorbonne.
 Nicholas Evans, Head of Linguistics, School of Culture, History and Language, College of Asia-Pacific, Australian National University.
 Susan Fiske, Eugene Higgins Professor of Psychology, Princeton University.
 Patrick Geary, Distinguished Professor of History, University of California, Los Angeles.
 Jane Ginsburg, Morton L. Janklow Professor of Literary and Artistic Property Law, Columbia University.
 William Harris, Professor of History and Director of the Center for the Ancient Mediterranean, Columbia University.
 Kirsten Hastrup, Professor of Anthropology, University of Copenhagen.
 Will Kymlicka, Canada Research Chair in Political Philosophy, Queen's University, Canada.
 Patrick Le Galès, CNRS Research Professor, Centre d’Etudes Européennes, Sciences Po Paris.
 Chiara Saraceno, Forschungsprofessorin, Wissenschaftszentrum Berlin für Sozialforschung.
 Thomas Sargent, Senior Fellow, Hoover Institution, Stanford University; Professor of Economics, New York University.
 Michael Wood, Charles Barnwell Straut Class of 1923 Professor of English and Comparative Literature, Princeton University.

Honorary fellows

 Sir Tim Berners-Lee, OM, KBE, FRS, FREng, Director, World Wide Web Consortium; 3Com Founders Professor, MIT Computer Science and Artificial Intelligence Laboratory.
 Sir Richard Brook, OBE, ScD, FREng, Emeritus Professor, Department of Materials, University of Oxford; Formerly Director of The Leverhulme Trust.

2010 
The following fellows of the British Academy were elected at the annual general meeting in 2010:

 David Abulafia, Professor of Mediterranean History, University of Cambridge 
 Alan Baker, Life Fellow, Emmanuel College, University of Cambridge 
 Alan Barnard, Professor of the Anthropology of Southern Africa, University of Edinburgh 
 Mary Beard, Professor of Classics, University of Cambridge 
 Jonathan Bradshaw, CBE. Professor of Social Policy, University of York 
 Francesco Caselli, Professor of Economics, London School of Economics 
 Christopher Clark, Professor of Modern European History, University of Cambridge 
 Eric F. Clarke, Heather Professor of Music, University of Oxford 
 Rosemary Crompton, Professor Emeritus, City University 
 Stephen Daniels, Professor of Cultural Geography, University of Nottingham 
 Neil Duxbury, Professor of Law, London School of Economics 
 Anke Ehlers, Professor of Experimental Psychopathology and Wellcome Principal Research Fellow, King's College London
 James Fawcett, Professor of International Commercial Law, University of Nottingham 
 Conor Gearty, Professor of Human Rights Law, London School of Economics 
 Robert Gildea, Professor of Modern History, University of Oxford 
 John Gledhill, Max Gluckman Professor of Social Anthropology, University of Manchester 
 Cecilia Heyes, Senior Research Fellow of All Souls College and Professor of Psychology, University of Oxford 
 Deborah Howard, Professor of Architectural History; Fellow, St John's College, University of Cambridge 
 Terence Irwin, Professor of Ancient Philosophy; Fellow, Keble College, University of Oxford
 Colin Kidd, Professor of Modern History, University of Glasgow 
 Anthony King, Essex County Council Millennium Professor of British Government, University of Essex 
 Aditi Lahiri, Professor of Linguistics, University of Oxford 
 Shalom Lappin, Professor of Computational Linguistics, King's College London 
 Richard Little, Professor Emeritus in International Politics, University of Bristol 
 Graham Loomes, Professor of Economics, University of Warwick 
 Andrew Louth, Professor of Patristic and Byzantine Studies, University of Durham 
 Juliet Mitchell, Director, Expanded Programme in Theoretical Psychoanalysis, University College London; Honorary Senior Research Associate, Dept of Geography and Professor Emerita, Psychoanalysis and Gender Studies; Fellow Emeritus, Jesus College, University of Cambridge 
 Karalyn Patterson, FMedSci. Senior Research Associate, Department of Clinical Neurosciences, University of Cambridge 
 Nicholas Penny, Director, The National Gallery 
 Emilie Savage-Smith, Professor of the History of Islamic Science, Senior Research Consultant, The Bodleian Library; Archivist (Fellow Archivist), St Cross College, University of Oxford 
 Michael Sheringham, Marshal Foch Professor of French Literature, University of Oxford 
 Roland R. R. Smith, Lincoln Professor of Classical Archaeology and Art, University of Oxford 
 Anthony Thiselton, Professor of Christian Theology, University of Nottingham; Emeritus Professor, University of Chester 
 John Van Reenen, Professor of Economics; Director, Centre for Economic Performance, London School of Economics 
 Nicholas Vincent, Professor of Medieval History, University of East Anglia 
 Andrew Wallace-Hadrill, OBE. Master of Sidney Sussex College, University of Cambridge 
 Stephen White, James Bryce Professor of Politics, University of Glasgow 
 Henry Woudhuysen, Professor of English Language and Literature; Dean, Faculty of Arts and Humanities, University College London

Corresponding fellows

 Kofi Agawu, Professor of Music, Princeton University; Adjunct Professor, The University of Ghana, Legon.
 Peter Brooks, Sterling Professor Emeritus of Comparative Literature, Yale University; Andrew W. Mellon Foundation Scholar in the University Center for Human Values and the Department of Comparative Literature, Princeton University.
 Janet Browne, Aramont Professor of the History of Science, Harvard University.
 Francis X. Clooney, Parkman Professor of Divinity and Comparative Theology, Harvard Divinity School.
 Lorraine Daston, Director, Max Planck Institute for the History of Science; Visiting Professor in the Committee on Social Thought, University of Chicago.
 Stanislas Dehaene, Professor, Collège de France; Directeur, INSERM-CEA Cognitive Neuroimaging Unit.
 Phillipe Descola, Professor, Collège de France; Director of Studies, École des Hautes Études en Sciences Sociales, Paris.
 Gøsta Esping-Andersen, Icrea Academia Professor of Sociology, Universita Pompeu Fabra.
 Michael F. Goodchild, Professor of Geography, University of California, Santa Barbara.
 James Gordley, W.R. Irby Professor of Law, Tulane University Law School.
 Paul Kiparsky, Robert M. and Anne T. Bass Professor in the School of Humanities and Sciences, Stanford University.
 Guy Laroque, Head of Laboratoire de Macroéconomie, INSEE-CREST; Professor of Economics, University College London.
 Hermann Parzinger, Dr. H.C. Mult. President, Prussian Cultural Heritage Foundation.
 Robert O'Keohane, Icrea Academia Professor of Sociology, Universita Pompeu Fabra.
 Justin Yifu Lin, Chief Economist and Senior Vice-, World Bank; on leave from Peking University.

Honorary fellows
 Lord Bragg of Wigton, FRS, FRSL, FRTS. Chancellor, University of Leeds; independent writer and broadcaster.

References